A Bangalore torpedo is an explosive charge placed within one or several connected tubes. It is used by combat engineers to clear obstacles that would otherwise require them to approach directly, possibly under fire. It is sometimes colloquially referred to as a "Bangalore mine", "banger" or simply "Bangalore" as well as a pole charge.

Per United States Army Field Manual 5-250 section 1–14, page 1–12 "b. Use. The primary use of the torpedo is clearing paths through wire obstacles and heavy undergrowth. It will clear a 3- to 4-metre wide path through wire obstacles."

Overview 

The Bangalore torpedo was devised by Captain R. L. McClintock of the Royal Engineers while attached to the Madras Sappers and Miners unit of the Indian Army at Bangalore, India, in 1912. He invented it as a means of blowing up booby traps and barricades left over from the Second Boer War and the Russo-Japanese War.

Bangalore torpedoes were manufactured until 2017 by Mondial Defence Systems of Poole, UK, for the UK and US armed forces. An improved version called the Advanced Performance Bangalore Torpedo (APBT) was developed by Chemring Energetics UK, part of the Chemring Group, in response to a British Ministry of Defence requirement issued in 2008; the APBT was chosen by the MOD following competitive performance trials and is also in use with the militaries of Australia, the Netherlands, and New Zealand. They have been used during the Afghanistan War for actions such as clearing mines or razor wire.

In World War I 
By the time of World War I the Bangalore torpedo was primarily used for clearing barbed wire before an attack. It could be used while under fire, from a protected position in a trench. The torpedo was standardized to consist of a number of externally identical  lengths of threaded pipe, one of which contained the explosive charge. The pipes would be screwed together using connecting sleeves to make a longer pipe of the required length, somewhat like a chimney brush or drain clearing rod.

A smooth nose cone would be screwed on the end to prevent snagging on the ground. During the 1917 Battle of Cambrai, British Royal Engineers used them as diversions to distract the enemy from where the real battle was to be fought.

In World War II 

The Bangalore torpedo was reportedly used in the British offensive on Bardia during the Western Desert Campaign, on 3 January 1941.

The Bangalore torpedo was later adopted by the U.S. Army during World War II, as the "M1A1 Bangalore torpedo". Each end of the torpedo had a recess to accommodate a standard Corps of Engineers blasting cap. Torpedo sections could be attached together via spring clip-equipped connecting sleeves, and a blunt nose sleeve was provided so that the assembled torpedoes could be pushed through obstacles or across terrain without getting stuck.

It was widely used by the U.S. Army, notably during the D-Day landings. The Bangalore torpedo was obsolete in British use at the time of D-Day, having been replaced by rocket-launched Congers and Armoured Vehicle Royal Engineers (AVRE) vehicles equipped with a  explosive charge for bunker clearing.

Post-World War II development 

The U.S. Army and the People's Army of Vietnam used the Bangalore torpedo during the Vietnam War.

During the Yom Kippur War in 1973, Bangalore torpedoes were used by the Israelis to clear paths through Syrian minefields.

Bangalore torpedoes continue to be used today in the little-changed M1A2 and M1A3 versions (United States Armed Forces) and the modified Advanced Performance Bangalore Torpedo version (British Armed Forces and Australian Defence Force, under the L26A1 designation which is also used by Chemring), primarily to breach wire obstacles. Combat engineers have also been known to construct similar field versions of the Bangalore by assembling segments of metal picket posts and filling the concave portion with plastic explosive (PE). The PE is then primed with detonating cord and a detonator, and pickets are taped or wired together to make a long torpedo, producing fragments (aka "shrapnel") that cut the wire when detonated. This method produces results similar to the standard-issue Bangalore, and can be assembled to the desired length by adding picket segments.

Newer Bangalore variants include the Alford Technologies Bangalore Blade and the Chemring Advanced Performance Bangalore Torpedo (APBT), with both of these having been developed in the United Kingdom. The Bangalore Blade is made from lightweight aluminium and is configured as a linear explosively formed projectile (EFP) array capable of cutting wire obstacles which earlier Bangalore variants were incapable of breaching effectively; the improvements introduced with the Bangalore Blade give the charge a cutting action as well as a blasting effect. In a test detonation conducted on the television show Future Weapons, the Bangalore Blade blasted a gap roughly five meters wide in concertina wire, and created a trench deep enough to detonate most nearby anti-personnel mines. Alford Technologies' web page for the Bangalore Blade cites additional trial detonations involving two identical triple-razor wire entanglements erected between steel pickets; a Bangalore torpedo conforming to the original design cleared a three-metre path, while the Bangalore Blade cleared a ten-metre path. The Advanced Performance Bangalore Torpedo also uses an aluminium body and is filled with two kilograms of DPX1 high density pressed explosive; a unique and patented design feature is incorporated which, in combination with the DPX1 explosive, provides enhanced blast and fragmentation effects which in turn provide an enhanced cutting capability against both simple and complex wire entanglements. The APBT is capable of cutting through up to six millimetres of steel plating. Up to eight APBTs can be combined with one another, with the resulting assembly capable of defeating obstacles that are up to eight metres in length; the quick-turn thread used for this purpose has been designed for ease of assembly when contaminated with sand, soil, or mud whilst being strong enough to ensure reliable deployment of connected charges without inadvertent decoupling. The APBT also has an improved Insensitive Munition signature compared to preceding in-service designs.

Other recent path-clearing devices 
The U.S. anti-personnel obstacle breaching system (APOBS) is being brought into service as a replacement to the Bangalore for path-clearing due to their ease of use, effectiveness, and flexibility – they can clear a path several times longer than the Bangalore torpedo.

See also 
 Canadian pipe mine
 Mine-clearing line charge

References

External links 
 Bangalore Torpedoes February 1944 Popular Science World War II article
 Future Weapons: Bangalore Blade (video)

Explosive weapons
Anti-fortification weapons
Mine warfare countermeasures
World War I infantry weapons
World War II infantry weapons of the United States
World War II infantry weapons of the United Kingdom
History of the Madras Sappers
History of Bangalore
English inventions